Energy principles in structural mechanics express the relationships between stresses, strains or deformations, displacements, material properties, and external effects in the form of energy or work done by internal and external forces. Since energy is a scalar quantity, these relationships provide convenient and alternative means for formulating the governing equations of deformable bodies in solid mechanics. They can also be used for obtaining approximate solutions of fairly complex systems, bypassing the difficult task of solving the set of governing partial differential equations.

General principles
 Virtual work principle
Principle of virtual displacements
Principle of virtual forces
Unit dummy force method
 Modified variational principles

Elastic systems
 Minimum total potential energy principle
 Principle of stationary total complementary potential energy
 Castigliano's first theorem (for forces)

Linear elastic systems
 Castigliano's second theorem (for displacements)
 Betti's reciprocal theorem
 Müller-Breslau's principle

Applications
 Governing equations by variational principles
 Approximate solution methods
 Finite element method in structural mechanics

Bibliography
Charlton, T.M.; Energy Principles in Theory of Structures, Oxford University Press, 1973.  
Dym, C. L. and I. H. Shames; Solid Mechanics: A Variational Approach, McGraw-Hill, 1973.
Hu, H. Variational Principles of Theory of Elasticity With Applications; Taylor & Francis, 1984.  
Langhaar, H. L.; Energy Methods in Applied Mechanics, Krieger, 1989.
Moiseiwitsch, B. L.; Variational Principles, John Wiley and Sons, 1966. 
Mura, T.; Variational Methods in Mechanics, Oxford University Press, 1992.  
Reddy, J.N.; Energy Principles and Variational Methods in Applied Mechanics, John Wiley, 2002.  
Shames, I. H. and Dym, C. L.; Energy and Finite Element Methods in Structural Mechanics, Taylor & Francis, 1995,  
Tauchert, T.R.; Energy Principles in Structural Mechanics, McGraw-Hill, 1974. 
Washizu, K.; Variational Methods in Elasticity and Plasticity, Pergamon Pr, 1982.  
Wunderlich, W.; Mechanics of Structures: Variational and Computational Methods, CRC, 2002. 

Structural analysis
Calculus of variations